The Van Alstyne Independent School District is a public school district in Grayson County, Texas, United States, based in Van Alstyne. The district extends into portions of northern Collin County.

In the 2018-2009 school year, the school district received an A rating (97 out of 100) from the Texas Education Agency.

Schools
The Van Alstyne Independent School District has two elementary schools, one middle school, and one high school.

Elementary school
John and Nelda Partin Elementary School (Formerly Van Alstyne Elementary School)
Bob and Lola Sanford Elementary School

Middle school
Van Alstyne Middle School

High school
Van Alstyne High School

References

External links

School districts in Grayson County, Texas
School districts in Collin County, Texas